The Battle of Dol was a succession of battles in the war in the Vendée. They lasted three days and two nights from 20 to 22 November 1793 around Dol-de-Bretagne, Pontorson and Antrain.

Dol
Dol
Military history of Brittany
Military history of Normandy
History of Ille-et-Vilaine
History of Manche